Kestel, Nazilli is a village in the District of Nazilli, Aydın Province, Turkey. As of 2010, it has a population of 262 people.

References

Villages in Nazilli District